Baldur's Gate is a fantasy role-playing video game that was developed by BioWare and published in 1998 by Interplay Entertainment. It is the first game in the Baldur's Gate series and takes place in the Forgotten Realms, a high fantasy campaign setting, using a modified version of the Advanced Dungeons & Dragons (AD&D) 2nd edition rules. It was the first game to use the Infinity Engine for its graphics, with Interplay using the engine for other Forgotten Realms-licensed games, including the Icewind Dale series and Planescape: Torment. The game's story focuses on a player-made character who travels across the Sword Coast alongside a party of companions.

The game received critical acclaim following its release and was credited for revitalizing computer role-playing games. An expansion pack was released entitled Tales of the Sword Coast, as was a sequel entitled Baldur's Gate II: Shadows of Amn, which later received its own expansion called Throne of Bhaal. An enhanced version of the Infinity Engine was later created as part of Beamdog's remake entitled Baldur's Gate: Enhanced Edition, the first new release in the franchise in nearly nine years.

Gameplay

Players conduct the game from a top-down isometric third-person perspective, creating a character who then travels across pre-rendered locations, taking on quests, recruiting companions to aid them, and combating enemies, while working towards completing the game's main story. Control is done through a user interface that allows a player to move characters and give them actions to undertake, review information on on-going quests and the statistics of characters in their party, manage their inventories, and organize the formation of the party, though the screen does not need to be centered on the characters being controlled and can be moved around with the mouse and keyboard, the latter also capable of accessing various player options through keyboard shortcuts. All of the game play mechanics were coded to conform to the Advanced Dungeons & Dragons 2nd edition role-playing rules, with the game automatically computing rule intricacies, including tracking statistics and dice rolling. Although the game is conducted in real-time, some elements of the rule set were modified to allow it to feature a pausable real-time mode. This allowed players to pause the game at any time and prepare what actions a character would do, including the ability to set the game to automatically pause at preset points in combat.

Each new playthrough requires the player to either create a new character, or import one they exported from a previous playthrough. Every new character requires the player to determine what their name, gender, race, class, and alignment are, and what ability scores and weapon proficiencies they have. New characters can also be multi-class, but must adhere to the restrictions that come from this, in accordance to the 2nd edition rules; for example, a character who is both a cleric and a fighter, may only use weapons of the former class.

The game's main story is divided up into eight parts, featuring a prologue and seven chapters. Each section requires the player to complete a specific task in order to continue. Some areas of the map are not accessible until the player has advanced to a specific chapter.  A player may have up to five companions travelling with them in their party, with the player free to decide whom to recruit or dismiss from the party.

The main UI consists of three action bars surrounding the main screen. The first bar consists of a map, journal, character records, their inventories, spellbooks and a clock. The second bar consists of a portrait of each character in the party, their HP, order, and any effects they are experiencing. The third bar provides specific actions per the number of characters being controlled: if a single character is selected, the player has the ability to switch between the weapons the character is wielding, use spells or items, or utilize a character's or piece of equipment's special abilities. If more than one character is selected, the bar displays options for conversing with or attacking NPCs, stop what is being done, or change their formation.

The inventory system allows each character to equip items categorized as: weapons, ammunition, armor, helmets, necklaces, rings, belts, cloaks, feet, or usable. The number of items a character can both equip and carry is affected by their weight limit, which is determined by their Strength ability score; going over this limit will encumber the character causing them to move slowly or prevent them moving altogether until they remove items from their inventory. The system also indicates what equipment a character may not use as defined by their class. This mechanic also determines how many weapon slots they have available; by default, all character have two weapon slots, with an off-hand slot for shields. Some classes allow characters additional weapon slots. Characters may equip three stacks of ammo for ranged weapons (bows, crossbows and slings), and use three different types of usable items (potions, scrolls and wands).

Conversation can be initiated by players selecting a member of the party and clicking on a friendly or neutral NPC. Some conversations are initiated automatically when characters come close to them. Certain NPCs offer services the player can utilize, including buying and selling items and identifying enchanted items. Other useful places include inns where the party can rest in safety to recover lost hit points and memorize spells, as well as temples where characters can pay for healing services, such as resurrecting a dead party member.

Other features that affect gameplay include:

 The ability to customize their character after creation, albeit with some restrictions.
 The ability to change the primary and minor colors used by each character.
 The ability to switch the game's AI on or off, and change what script a character uses.
 Most locations are hidden when first visited but are revealed as the character moves around them. A fog of war effect hides explored areas when the player's characters move away from them.
 A reputation system that tracks the moral actions of the PC and affects how they are perceived, changing if they resolve a problem or commit a crime in the view of witnesses. Higher reputations cause shops to decrease prices, while lower reputations cause shops to increase prices. Lower reputations may also lead to the character being attacked when in town. Companions are also affected by reputation, with evil companions leaving the party, even attacking it, if it is high, and good and neutral companions leaving when it is low. Some side quests also require a minimum reputation to begin. Certain NPCs may also react negatively or positively depending on their alignment and the player's reputation. 
 The ability to keep track of in-game time through the changes in lighting and the activity that is occurring. Characters become fatigued after spending a full in-game day, especially after travelling long distances between world map locations, and must rest to recover, either in an inn or camping out in the countryside/within a dungeon.
 Characters can be ambushed when camping out or travelling long distances between world map locations.
 Players can play either in single-player mode, or in multiplayer mode. The latter allows up to six players to work together online with their own created characters.

Plot

Setting

Baldur's Gate takes place in the fictional world of Ed Greenwood's Forgotten Realms setting, during the year of 1368DR in the midst of an apparent iron shortage, where items made with iron inexplicably rot and break. Focusing upon the western shoreline of Faerûn, the game is set within a stretch of the region known as the Sword Coast, which contains a multitude of ecologies and terrains, including mountains, forests, plains, cities, and ruins, with the story encompassing both the city of Baldur's Gate, the largest and most affluent city in the region, and the lands south of it, including the Cloud Peaks, the Wood of Sharp Teeth, the Cloakwood forest, the town of Beregost and the village of Nashkel, and the fortress citadel of Candlekeep. In addition to the region, a variety of organisations from the Forgotten Realms setting also feature as part of the game's main story, including the Zhentarim, the Red Wizards of Thay, The Iron Throne, the Flaming Fist, The Chill, The Black Talons, and the Harpers.

Characters
Baldur's Gate includes around 25 player companions that can join with the PC. A number of the characters who appear include several who are canon to the official Forgotten Realms campaign setting, including Drizzt Do'Urden and Elminster.

Story
The player character is the young and orphaned ward of the mage Gorion. The two live in the ancient library fortress of Candlekeep. Abruptly, the Ward is instructed by Gorion to prepare to leave the citadel during the night with no explanation. That night, a mysterious armoured figure and his cohorts ambush the pair and order Gorion to hand over the Ward. Gorion refuses, and dies in the ensuing battle, while urging his Ward to escape. The next morning, the Ward encounters Imoen, a childhood friend and fellow orphan from Candlekeep, who had followed them in secret. With Candlekeep no longer accessible to them without Gorion's influence to circumvent its admission fee, and the city of Baldur's Gate currently closed off to outsiders due to bandit raids, the Ward resolves to investigate the cause of the region's Iron Crisis.

Travelling to the mines of Nashkel, the main source of the region's iron, the Ward's party discovers that the mine's ore is being contaminated by a group of kobolds led by a half-orc, and that they and the bandits plaguing the region are being controlled by an organization known as the Iron Throne, a merchant outfit operating out of Baldur's Gate. After sabotaging a mine operated by the Iron Throne in the Cloakwood that would presumably give them total control over the region's iron, the Ward's party travels to the newly reopened Baldur's Gate. Invading the Throne's headquarters, the group learns that proof of the organization's involvement with the Iron Crisis was taken by one of the regional leaders when they and the rest of the leadership headed to Candlekeep for an important meeting. Revealing their findings to Duke Eltan, the leader of the Flaming Fist, the group receive a rare and valuable book, which would allow them access into Candlekeep, in order to spy on the meeting. During their investigations in the citadel's library, the Ward discovers a prophecy written by the ancient seer Alaundo, foretelling how the offspring created during the Time of Troubles by the dead god Bhaal, the Lord of Murder, will sow chaos until only one remains to become the new Lord of Murder. The Ward then finds a letter from Gorion revealing that the Ward is among the offspring of Bhaal, known as Bhaalspawn. During their stay at Candlekeep, the Ward's party is imprisoned for the murders of the Iron Throne leaders, regardless of whether or not they did so, until they can be transported to Baldur's Gate to be executed. Tethoril, a prominent keeper in Candlekeep, visits the party and reveals that a suspicious character the party met earlier, Koveras, is really the foster son of one of the now dead Iron Throne leaders. His name is Sarevok, the one responsible for Gorion's murder, and who also wishes to kill the Ward.

Believing the Ward to be innocent, Tethoril transports the party into the catacombs beneath the fortress, where the party battle their way through doppelgängers taking on the forms of people the Ward knew in Candlekeep. Returning to Baldur's Gate, the Ward's party find themselves accused of causing the Iron Crisis on the orders of the Kingdom of Amn, assassinating one of the city's Grand Dukes, and poisoning Duke Eltan. Forced to stay hidden from the Flaming Fist, the party discovers that the Iron Throne orchestrated the Iron Crisis to gain control of iron through their mine in the Cloakwood, while using doppelgängers to weaken other merchant outfits, ensuring that they would have a monopoly on iron. With tensions rising between Baldur's Gate and Amn, the organization hoped to sell the stockpiled iron to the city at exorbitant prices. Afterward, they aimed to de-escalate tensions between Baldur's Gate and Amn.

The party also discovers that Sarevok, having discovered that he was a Bhaalspawn, hoped to fuel distrust between Baldur's Gate and Amn by making each think the other was responsible for creating the crisis, and cause them to go to war. Sarevok believed that the resulting carnage would be enough to allow him to become the new Lord of Murder. Due to the Ward's similar background, he hired assassins to kill them. Sarevok remained loyal to his father until the Iron Throne's meeting in Candlekeep threatened his plans, which led Sarevok to eliminate him and the other regional leaders of the Iron Throne before taking over the outfit and transferring their stores of iron to the city in order to be seen as a savior. He was also responsible for the poisoning of Duke Eltan and the assassination of one of the four Grand Dukes.

The Ward's party gain entry to the Ducal Palace, where the coronation of Sarevok as a Grand Duke of Baldur's Gate would be held, and present evidence of his schemes. Exposed, Sarevok flees into an ancient underground ruin beneath Baldur's Gate, with the Ward and the party following after. The Ward confronts Sarevok within an ancient temple to Bhaal, and defeats him, saving the Sword Coast and ending their brother's schemes. In the final ending cinematic, Sarevok's tainted soul departs his body and travels deep underground to a large circular chamber of alcoves, and destroys a statue of himself contained in one of the alcoves, whereupon it is revealed that the other alcoves each contain a statue of a Bhaalspawn that exists in Faerûn.

Development and release
Baldur's Gate began development in 1995 by Canadian game developer BioWare, a company founded by Ray Muzyka, Greg Zeschuk, Trent Oster, his brother Brent, Zeschuk's cousin Marcel, and Augustine Yip. The game was initially titled Forgotten Realms. According to Muzyka, "our head programmer has actually read every one of the [Forgotten Realms] books - everything, every single one of the short stories and the paperbacks. He made a point of it. He really wanted to immerse himself". The game required 90 man-years of development, which was spent simultaneously creating the game's content and the BioWare Infinity Engine. The primary script engine for the game (used mainly as a debugging tool) was Lua. DirectDraw was used for the graphics. Wasteland was a major influence on Baldur's Gate, particularly its design philosophy of having more than one possible method to achieve each goal.

Unusually for the time, the graphics were not built from tiles; each background was individually rendered, which greatly extended the amount of time needed to create the game. At the time that the game was shipped, none of the sixty-member team had previously participated in the release of a video game. The time pressure to complete the game led to the use of simple areas and game design. Ray Muzyka said that the team held a "passion and a love of the art" and they developed a "collaborative design spirit". He believes that the game was successful because of the collaboration with Interplay.

According to writer Luke Kristjanson, the character of Imoen was a late addition to fill a "non-psychotic-thief gap in the early levels". Kristjanson assembled Imoen's lines by editing voice-over for a guard character named Pique from an unused demo, and explained that her lack of voiced dialogue or standalone interactions with other party members throughout the game was due to budgetary constraints. The wife of Dean Anderson, a team member who later served as the art director of the 2009 role-playing game  Dragon Age: Origins, was the basis for Imoen's facial features as depicted in her character portrait.

Baldur's Gate was released on December 21, 1998, and was published by Black Isle Studios, an internal division of Interplay.

Reception

Sales
According to Feargus Urquhart, Interplay's commercial forecasts for Baldur's Gate were "very low". He noted that the publisher's headquarters in Britain predicted zero sales in that region. Lifetime projections for the German market were "no more than 50,000" copies, reported Udo Hoffman of PC Player. Internally, BioWare's worldwide sales goal was 200,000 units, a number that PC Zones Dave Woods said would "justify work on the sequel". However, the game became an unexpected commercial hit. Ray Muzyka attributed this success in part to the Dungeons & Dragons license, and to the team's decision to use fan feedback during development, which he felt had increased the game's mass-market appeal.

Following its shipment to retailers on December 21, Baldur's Gate began to sell at a "phenomenal rate", according to Mark Asher of CNET Gamecenter. He wrote at the time that its "first run of 50,000 copies sold out immediately and Interplay's elves are working hard to get more games to the stores". The title debuted in the United States at #3 on PC Data's computer game sales rankings for the week ending January 2, 1999. It sold-through 55,071 copies in the country by the end of 1998, for revenues of $2.56 million. In its second week, Baldur's Gate rose to #2 in the United States. Internationally, it debuted at #1 on 's computer game charts for the German market in the first half of January 1999, and reached first place on Chart-Track's equivalent for the United Kingdom by its second week. According to Interplay, Baldur's Gate also took #1 on the charts in Canada and France. Its global sales reached 175,000 units by mid-January 1999, a sales rate that the Los Angeles Times reported as Interplay's fastest ever. This performance led to a stock-price increase for the company.

In the United States, Baldur's Gate remained in PC Data's weekly top 3 from January 10 through February 6. It claimed #1 for January, with sales of 80,500 copies and revenues of $3.6 million in the country that month. Supply shortages continued throughout much of January. The game likewise secured Media Control's #1 position for the entirety of that month, and held at #1 for the United Kingdom in its third week. Baldur's Gate subsequently took #4 for February in the German market and #3 in the United States, after holding in the latter country's weekly top 10 from February 7 – March 6. By mid-February, Gamecenter reported sales of 450,000 units for Baldur's Gate, which Asher called "the biggest hit Interplay has had since Descent" and a rebuttal to the common belief that role-playing games were commercially moribund. Worldwide sales totaled more than 500,000 copies by the end of that month. Despite these figures, Interplay posted a loss of $16 million for the fourth quarter of 1998, and of $28 million for the year. Brian Fargo attributed the losses in part to Baldur's Gate: he wrote that it "did not ship until the last days of 1998, which reduced shipments in the quarter to about half the projected volume".

Baldur's Gate maintained its unbroken streak in PC Data's weekly top 10 through the week ending March 27, after which it was absent. It then took seventh for March, and was absent from the United States' monthly top 20 by April. However, it held in Chart-Track's British top 20 during April, after 13 weeks; and in Media Control's top 10 and top 20 during the second halves of March, April and May. Baldur's Gates sales in the German market during its initial months reached 90,000 units, a success for the region. Coinciding with the release of the Tales of the Sword Coast expansion pack in the United States, Baldur's Gate returned to PC Data's top 10 for a week in May. Thereafter, it became a staple of the firm's monthly top 20 from May through August.

Interplay reported worldwide sales of nearly 700,000 copies for Baldur's Gate by June, and it was the United States' second-best-selling computer game during the first half of 1999, behind SimCity 3000. As of September, it had sold above 300,000 units and earned roughly $15 million in revenues in the country during 1999 alone. A writer for PC Accelerator remarked that this success "created an almost audible sigh of relief from publisher Interplay". By November 1999, Baldur's Gate had sold roughly 1 million units worldwide. It claimed ninth place for 1999 in the United States, with a total of 356,448 sales that year. At $15.7 million in revenue, it was the country's seventh-highest-grossing computer game of 1999.

Sales of Baldur's Gate continued in 2000: by March, it had surpassed 500,000 copies sold in the United States, which led Desslock of GameSpot to describe the title as an "undisputed commercial blockbuster". U.S. sales had risen to 600,000 units by April 2001, while global sales totaled 1.5 million copies that May. The game proceeded to sell 83,208 units in the United States from February 2001 through the first week of November alone. Worldwide, Baldur's Gate ultimately surpassed 2.2 million sales by early 2003. By 2015 the game sold about 2.8 million copies.

Reviews and awards

Baldur's Gate received positive reviews from virtually every major computer gaming publication that reviewed it. At the time of the game's release, PC Gamer US said that Baldur's Gate "reigns supreme over every RPG currently available, and sets new standards for those to come". Computer Shopper called it "clearly the best Advanced Dungeons & Dragons (AD&D) game ever to grace a PC screen". Maximum PC magazine compared the gameplay to Diablo, but noted its more extensive selection of features and options. The pixel-based characters were panned, but the reviewer stated that "the gloriously rendered backgrounds make up for that shortcoming". The main criticism was of the problems with the path finding algorithm for non-player characters. Despite this, the game was deemed an "instant classic" because of the amount of customization allowed, the "fluid story lines", and the replayability. The reviewer from Pyramid felt that the "basic buzz was positive" surrounding the development of the game. The "actual results are a mixed bag, but there's real promise for the future" thanks to the inclusion of the Infinity Engine.

Baldur's Gate was named the best computer role-playing game of 1998 by the Academy of Interactive Arts & Sciences, the Academy of Adventure Gaming Arts & Design, Computer Gaming World, the Game Developers Conference, Computer Games Strategy Plus, IGN, CNET Gamecenter, The Electric Playground, RPG Vault, PC Gamer US and GameSpot. IGN, Computer Games and RPG Vault also presented it with their overall "Game of the Year" awards. The editors of Computer Games wrote that Baldur's Gate "delivers everything you could ask for in a computer game."

Baldur's Gate was #3 on CBR's 2020 "10 Of The Best DnD Stories To Start Off With" list — the article states that "beyond giving some insight on the Sword Coast, the game also provides a diverse cast of characters that your character can recruit into their party. This cast of character serves as a great source of inspiration to make interesting player characters".

Legacy
According to IGN, Baldur's Gate did much to revive the role-playing video game genre. John Harris of Gamasutra wrote that it "rescued computer D&D from the wastebasket". According to GameSpy, Baldur's Gate was a "triumph" that "single-handedly revived" the computer role-playing game and "almost made gamers forgive Interplay for Descent to Undermountain". IGN ranked Baldur's Gate number five on their list of "The Top 11 Dungeons & Dragons Games of All Time" in 2014. Phil Savage of PC Gamer praised Bioware's level design for the titular city in Baldur's Gate, stating that "Baldur's Gate feels vast, exciting and dangerous—just like a proper city".

Baldur's Gate was the first game in the Baldur's Gate series. It was followed by the expansion pack Tales of the Sword Coast (1999), then the sequel Baldur's Gate II: Shadows of Amn (2000) and its expansion pack Throne of Bhaal (2001). As of 2006, total sales for all releases in the series was almost five million copies. The series set the standard for other games using AD&D rules, especially those developed by BioWare and Black Isle Studios: Planescape: Torment (1999), Icewind Dale (2000), and Icewind Dale II (2002). The novel Baldur's Gate (1999) by Philip Athans was based on the game.

Baldur's Gate was re-released along with its expansion in 2000 as Baldur's Gate Double Pack, and again in 2002 as a three CD collection entitled Baldur's Gate: The Original Saga. In 2002, the game and its expansion were released along with Icewind Dale, Icewind Dale: Heart of Winter and Planescape: Torment as the Black Isle Compilation. In 2004, it was re-released, this time along with Icewind Dale II, in Part Two of the compilation. Atari published the Baldur's Gate 4 in 1 Boxset including all four games on a combination of DVDs and CDs.

Baldur's Gate and its expansion were released digitally on Good Old Games (later GOG.com) on September 23, 2010. It has also been made available via GameStop App as part of the D&D Anthology: The Master Collection, which also includes the expansion Baldur's Gate: Tales of the Sword Coast, Baldur's Gate II: Shadows of Amn, Baldur's Gate II: Throne of Bhaal, Icewind Dale, Icewind Dale: Heart of Winter, Icewind Dale: Trials of the Luremaster, Icewind Dale II, Planescape: Torment, and The Temple of Elemental Evil.

On March 15, 2012, a remake was announced entitled Baldur's Gate: Enhanced Edition. Five days later, Overhaul Games announced that the Enhanced Edition would also be released for the Apple iPad. On September 14, Trent Oster, president of Overhaul Games, announced that the game's release would be delayed until November, citing an overwhelming response and a desire to "make the best Baldur's Gate possible". The game was launched for Microsoft Windows on November 28, 2012, for iPad running iOS 6 or greater on December 7, 2012, for Mac OS X on February 22, 2013, and for Android on April 17, 2014. Baldur's Gate III is currently in development by Larian Studios.

Skybound Games, a division of Skybound Entertainment, brought Baldur's Gate: Enhanced Edition to the PlayStation 4, Xbox One, and Nintendo Switch on October 15, 2019.

Notes

References

External links
 

1998 video games
Baldur's Gate video games
BioWare games
Cancelled Dreamcast games
Cancelled PlayStation (console) games
Classic Mac OS games
Cooperative video games
D.I.C.E. Award for Role-Playing Game of the Year winners
Infinity Engine games
Interactive Achievement Award winners
Lua (programming language)-scripted video games
Mobile games
Multiplayer and single-player video games
Origins Award winners
Role-playing video games
Video games adapted into novels
Video games developed in Canada
Video games featuring protagonists of selectable gender
Video games scored by Michael Hoenig
Video games with expansion packs
Windows games